Khatmat Malaha is a 24-hour border crossing between the United Arab Emirates and Oman.

In Oman, the Batinah Expressway, a 256km 8-lane highway, links the Muscat Expressway in Halban to the United Arab Emirates border at Khatmat Malaha.

Wajaja is an alternative border crossing.

See also
 Transport in Oman
 Transport in the United Arab Emirates

References

Oman–United Arab Emirates border crossings